Greece competed at the 1980 Summer Paralympics in Arnhem, Netherlands. 7 competitors from Greece won a single bronze medal and finished joint 38th in the medal table with Luxembourg and Malta.

Medalists

See also 
 Greece at the Paralympics
 Greece at the 1980 Summer Olympics

References 

1980
1980 in Greek sport
Nations at the 1980 Summer Paralympics